Hannah Smith (1897–1960) was an American arts patron, philanthropist, and advocate for social change. Legendary for her salon parties, she enjoyed being the conduit for many unlikely meetings and collaborations. In 1938, when  a significant number of European artists were fleeing Europe, she started the Hannah Smith Agency in New York City. The Agency represented a select group of artists and thinkers, embodying Smith’s knack for collecting artists and ideas.

Background

Born in Philadelphia to an influential Quaker family, Smith’s background was one of high ideals, inquiring intellect and incipient feminism. This led to a rigorous education, on both sides of the Atlantic. Early on, family connections brought her into close contact with influential figures such as critic Bernard Berenson, philosopher Bertrand Russell, and Martha Carey Thomas (a relative whose unhappy love affair was fictionalized by Gertrude Stein in Fernhurst). It also set the tone for Smith’s later life: provoking, reconciling and enjoying a play of contradictory ideas.

The 1920s

In the 1920s Smith struck out on her own, making a crusading passion her defining characteristic. With connections to Gertrude Stein through Carey Thomas, Smith soon became enamored of the circle of American avant-gardists in Paris at this time. Stein and Alice B. Toklas, while holding Carey Thomas in highest regard, appear to have held reservations about the motives of the younger Smith. 
When a prized recipe book went missing, suspicion fell on Smith.

But Smith’s exuberant immersion in Paris social life and her family fortune made life less uncomfortable for many artists, composers, and intellectuals. Through previous Philadelphia connections to pianist Constantine von Sternberg and the patron Mary Louise Curtis Bok, Smith saw that composer George Antheil was supported to write his most famous work, the “Ballet Mécanique” in 1924. 
 
Under the influence of Antheil and Francis Picabia, among others, Smith became passionately interested in the possibilities of electronic and mechanical arts. In 1927 she acquired an early electronic instrument, an etherphone, from Leon Theremin. She was also attending various Movement Demonstrations at Gurdjieff’s Paris institute at this time. Experimentation with sound and drama using the prototype aetherphone ended abruptly with a nasty electric shock. After consultations with Gurdjieff and others, she concluded she would return her focus to promoting the works of others.

Her peripatetic partner in these activities was an American art student, Alexina “Teeny” Sattler (later Matisse, and later Duchamp). Unfortunately, this exuberant friendship was strained when “Teeny” married Pierre Matisse in 1929, rather against Smith’s advice.

Lou Andreas-Salomé was, perhaps more than anyone else, a role model. On a short stay in Paris she introduced Smith to the works of both Freud and Nietzsche. Andreas-Salomé left a number of unsent letters to Freud at Smith’s home. Smith kept them, but never opened them.

The 1930s
In the early 1930s, Smith attempted a return to the USA, summering in Los Angeles. While Smith enjoyed the brio of new ideas and buzz around Hollywood, she was not ready to leave Paris. The high point of this period was probably the tennis foursome Smith called together, with George Gershwin, Arnold Schoenberg and Groucho Marx. (Marx believing until the last minute that the Schoenberg in question was his uncle, the entertainer Al Schoenberg).
 
Returning to Paris, Smith’s position as a patron saw her play a useful role in the mounting of the Museum of Modern Art's 1936 exhibition, Fantastic, Dada, and Surrealism. The use of the word ”Fantastic” in the show’s title has been attributed to Smith.

Smith traveled to New York for the show’s opening. The exhibition’s rapturous reception amongst New York’s literati and the deteriorating political situation in Europe inclined Smith to return to America. She set up house in New York on West 51st Street, where she would live until her death.

In the spacious modernist apartment, she was the consummate host of soirées and culinary experiments that are said to have included among many others Max Ernst, Kurt Seligmann, Bob Motherwell, Little Richard, André Breton, Oscar Levant, Nikola Tesla, Dai Vernon, Linus Pauling, Louis Kahn, Maya Deren, John Cage, Joseph Cornell, Kurt Gödel, Nadia Boulanger Dylan Thomas, and Al Schoenberg.

In 1938, Smith famously wired Samuel Beckett in Paris while he was recuperating from a severe stabbing by the gangster pimp, Prudent. The telegram read, “STOP”.

The Hannah Smith Agency

Smith established her agency in New York in 1938. Keenly aware of the difficulties facing European artists arriving in New York, her intention was to make a professional practice of promoting new talents and ideas to a wider public.

Taking inspiration from the photographer Dorothy Norman, her intention was that avant-garde ideas would become part of the mainstream and effect social change.

In the late 1940s Smith sought to produce “The Witches' Cradle,” a film that Maya Deren and Marcel Duchamp envisaged in his Fourteenth Street studio but never completed, Deren giving up formal art practice upon her initiation into Vodou.

Smith supported the groundbreaking fieldwork of Ilona and Peter Opie in the 1950s, researching children’s games, toys and playgrounds. Through a connection with the Opies, at this time the Hannah Smith Agency sought publishing for Mim Hickman's complete and comprehensive archive of songs, dances and scrimshaw from Blackwaterfoot Bay in the Arran Isles.

In 1960, the Smith Agency sent 16mm cameras, film stock and editing equipment to the Yuat-Langam people in the Sepik River area of Papua New Guinea, the intention being that the Yuat-Langam people would collectively make movies and the Smith agency would arrange distribution.

Later Life.
With her health in decline, and with her admiration for John Cage and his work, Smith was an avid supporter of the Mycological Society of America and spent restful times in the forests of upstate New York with Cage and other mushroom-loving friends.

1897 births
1960 deaths
20th-century American philanthropists